Wilhelm Lache was an Austrian lugist who competed during the 1950s. He won five medals at the European luge championships with one gold (Men's doubles: 1953), two silvers (Men's singles: 1951, 1954), and two bronzes (Men's singles and doubles: both 1952).

References

Austrian male lugers
Possibly living people
Year of birth missing